Asota sulamangoliensis is a moth of the family Erebidae first described by Jaap H. H. Zwier in 2010. It is found in Sula Mangoli in Maluku, Indonesia.

References

Asota (moth)
Moths of Indonesia
Moths described in 2010